Rebecca Anne Easton (born 16 June 1974) is an English former footballer who played for Doncaster Rovers Belles, Everton and Liverpool.

Easton played as right-back and central midfielder and represented England at full international level. Merseysider Easton has won league titles with both Everton and Liverpool.

Club career
Easton joined Everton from Liverpool Ladies in 1997 and won the league title in her first season with The Blues. She had featured in Liverpool's FA Women's Cup final defeats in 1995 and 1996.

Easton had a second spell with Everton having re-signed from Doncaster Rovers Belles in the 2004 close season, where she had been captain.

In 2012 Easton was released by Everton, but won a contract for the 2013 FA WSL season with Liverpool after a successful trial.

With Easton in the team Liverpool won the league title in 2013 and 2014 but were much less successful in 2015, finishing second bottom. Her 2015 campaign was truncated by a broken arm. Aged 41, she was among four players to be released by the club at the end of the season.

In December 2015 Easton rejoined Doncaster Rovers Belles, where she would combine playing with a role as assistant general manager. Doncaster lost their four opening games and were marooned at the foot of the WSL 1 table, when Easton left the club by "mutual consent" in the mid-season break, ostensibly to focus on her studies.

International career
Easton represented England at senior level, playing in England's first ever FIFA Women's World Cup finals appearance in 1995, which ended with a 3–0 quarter-final defeat by Germany.

In 2000, she was named as the Nationwide International Player of the Year, based on her consistency for the national team.

Personal life
Easton worked as a podiatrist in Liverpool, until she began full-time football training during her second spell with Liverpool. She also embarked on a master's degree in sports directorship at Manchester Metropolitan University.

Easton is the niece of Paul O'Grady. On 26 May 2016, she married former teammate Natasha Dowie.

Honours

Club
Everton Ladies
 FA Women's Premier League (1): 1997–98
 FA Women's Premier League Cup (1): 2007–08
 FA Women's Cup (1): 2009–10

Liverpool Ladies
 WSL Women's Super League (2): 2013; 2014

References

External links

 
 

1974 births
Living people
English women's footballers
Everton F.C. (women) players
Doncaster Rovers Belles L.F.C. players
England women's international footballers
FA Women's National League players
Liverpool F.C. Women players
Women's Super League players
1995 FIFA Women's World Cup players
Sportspeople from Birkenhead
British podiatrists
Lesbian sportswomen
English LGBT sportspeople
LGBT association football players
Women's association football fullbacks
21st-century LGBT people